Kyle Steven Gallner (born October 22, 1986) is an American actor. He is known for his portrayal of Cassidy "Beaver" Casablancas in the television series Veronica Mars, superhero Bart Allen in the drama series Smallville and Reed Garrett in the police series CSI: NY, and a lead role as Hasil Farrell in the drama series Outsiders.  He is also known for his roles in American Sniper and the horror films Scream, The Haunting in Connecticut, Jennifer's Body, the remake of A Nightmare on Elm Street, and Smile.

Early life
Gallner was born in West Chester, Pennsylvania, to Larry and Mary Jane Gallner. He has three siblings: one older sister, one younger brother, and a younger sister. Gallner attended West Chester East High School. He started his career by following his sister along to one of her auditions. His father's family is Jewish.

Career

He proceeded to guest star on popular shows such as Judging Amy and Close to Home. Gallner joined the cast of Veronica Mars as Cassidy Casablancas toward the end of the show's first season, in May 2005, before becoming a season regular during the show's second season. After playing Bart Allen in the Smallville episode "Run", Gallner reprised the role on the January 18, 2007, episode "Justice" and the season eight finale. He also guest starred on Cold Case as a teenaged gunman in the episode "Rampage", and appeared in the independent film Sublime. In 2007, he guest starred in an episode of Law & Order: Special Victims Unit titled "Impulsive" as a high school student who accuses his teacher (played by Melissa Joan Hart) of statutory rape. He also guest starred in an episode of Bones as Jeremy Farrell, the suspected murderer of a child beauty-pageant contestant. He also played the lead role in the horror film The Haunting in Connecticut, playing a cancer patient who is tormented by evil spirits.

He appeared in the independent film Cherry, filmed on the campuses of Kalamazoo College and Western Michigan University, along with several locations in downtown Kalamazoo, Michigan. He plays Aaron, an Ivy-League freshman who falls for an older woman while becoming the object of affection for the woman's young daughter. Gallner played Quentin in the 2010 reboot of A Nightmare on Elm Street; his character is the love interest of main character Nancy. Gallner played the brother of Aaron Paul's character in the 2012 film, Smashed. Gallner played Zach in one episode in the fourth season of AMC's The Walking Dead. It was initially reported that he would be a recurring character, but his character was killed off, instead. In 2014, Gallner played the role of Kurt, the antagonist to lead character Sam, in the independent film Dear White People.

In September 2020, Gallner was cast as Vince Schneider in the fifth Scream film, which was directed by Matt Bettinelli-Olpin and Tyler Gillett. The film was released on January 14, 2022.

Personal life
Gallner married Tara Ferguson on December 12, 2015. They have two sons. 

In 2013, Gallner co-founded the independent production company Minutehand Pictures along with Oliver Thompson and Bay Dariz. The trio produced the feature film Welcome to Happiness, in which Gallner portrays Woody Ward, a children's book author with a secret door in his closet.

Filmography

Film

Television

Awards and nominations

References

External links

 
 Kyle Gallner on A Haunting in Connecticut at FEARnet

1986 births
Male actors from Pennsylvania
American male film actors
American male television actors
Living people
20th-century American male actors
21st-century American male actors
American male child actors
People from West Chester, Pennsylvania
American people of Jewish descent